Ronaldinho Gaucho's Team is an Italian animated television series based on the Brazilian soccer star Ronaldinho Gaúcho. The pilot episode was first broadcast on October 15, 2011, on the DeA Kids channel.

Ronaldinho Gaucho's Team is the first animated series for TV produced by the Italian studio GIG Italy Entertainment, with the co-production of MSP - Mauricio de Sousa Produções, which publishes in Brazil the Ronaldinho Gaucho comic strip based on the fictionalised version of Ronaldinho as a child. The stories are based on the animated adventures of the character in comics, with 52 episodes of 11 minutes each.

Cast 

 Mark Hanna: Diego
 Katie McGovern: Daisy
 George Todria: Assis

References

External links
 

2011 Italian television series debuts
2010s Italian television series
Italian children's animated television series
Television shows set in Brazil
Animation based on real people
Animated sports television series
Association football television series
Association football animation
Television series based on Brazilian comics
Fictional association football television series